was a Japanese entomologist who specialised in Lepidoptera.

He wrote Butterflies of Formosa in Colour Osaka, Hoikusha (1960), Early Stages of Japanese Butterflies in  Colour Hoikusha (with Akira Hara, 1960) and Butterflies of Japan Illustrated in Colour Tokyo, Hokuryu-kan (1964) all of which took advantage of Japanese advanced (optical) and colour printing technologies.
He also published many scientific papers describing new species of butterflies.

Dr. Takashi Shirozu was a professor emeritus of Kyushu University and president emeritus of The Lepidopterological Society of Japan.

References
2004: Obituary. Takashi Shirôzu (1917-2004). Transactions of the Lepidopterological Society of Japan 55(3) 133, including a portrait.

Japanese lepidopterists
Japanese entomologists
1917 births
2004 deaths
Academic staff of Kyushu University
University of Miyazaki alumni
20th-century Japanese zoologists